Luis Fernando Zuleta Maldonado (born 7 August 1974) is a retired Colombian football striker.

He was born in Santa Marta. He spent the main part of his career in Unión Magdalena from 1994 through 2007, except spells in Independiente Medellín in 1998, Atlético Junior in 2001, Independiente Santa Fe in 2003, Deportivo Pasto in 2004, and Atlético Huila in 2006. He rounded off his career with Salvadoran C.D. Águila in 2007–08 and Venezuelan Carabobo F.C. in 2008–09.

Zuleta became top goalscorer in the 2002 Categoría Primera A apertura season with 13 goals.

He was capped 4 times for Colombia national football team in 1997, including at the 1997 Copa América.

References

1974 births
Living people
Association football forwards
Colombian footballers
Colombia international footballers
1997 Copa América players
Unión Magdalena footballers
Independiente Medellín footballers
Atlético Junior footballers
Independiente Santa Fe footballers
Deportivo Pasto footballers
Atlético Huila footballers
C.D. Águila footballers
Carabobo F.C. players
Colombian expatriate footballers
Expatriate footballers in El Salvador
Colombian expatriates in El Salvador
Expatriate footballers in Venezuela
Colombian expatriate sportspeople in Venezuela
People from Santa Marta
Sportspeople from Magdalena Department